Essendon West is a suburb in Melbourne, Victoria, Australia,  north-west of Melbourne's Central Business District, located within the City of Moonee Valley local government area. Essendon West recorded a population of 1,559 at the 2021 census.

Essendon West is bounded in the west by the Steele Creek, in the north by Rosehill Road, in the east by Afton Street and Hoffmans Road, and in the south by the Maribyrnong River.

Essendon West is primarily residential with a range of housing ranging from inter war Californian Bungalows to post war dwellings to more modern homes.

History

Essendon West Post Office opened on 1 July 1924.

Community

Essendon West is represented by an Australian Rules football team, Doutta Stars, playing in the Essendon District Football League. Its home ground lies in neighbouring Essendon.

See also
 City of Keilor – Essendon West was previously within this former local government area.

References

Suburbs of Melbourne
Suburbs of the City of Moonee Valley